Grumbles from the Grave is a posthumous 1989 autobiography of science fiction author Robert A. Heinlein collated by his wife Virginia Heinlein from his notes and writings.

Background
The work is the closest that Heinlein, an ex-naval officer and prominent science fiction writer, came to writing an autobiography. The book contains a wide range of correspondence, notes and memoirs edited by Heinlein's wife Virginia, and was published a year and a half after his death.

Contents
Grumbles from the Grave provides insight into Heinlein's writing process (and the editorial/publishing process with which he was often at odds).   In addition, it contains evidence of his philosophy as applied to his life and personal opinions.  Beginning with a short biography of Robert by Virginia, the bulk of the book consists of excerpts of correspondence from the period from 1939 to 1970, from when he began writing science fiction until the onset of his first major illness. There is considerable information provided into how the 13-year gestation of Heinlein's novel Stranger in a Strange Land evolved. Additionally there is the original postlude to Podkayne of Mars and a discussion of cuts made to his novel Red Planet.

Criticisms
Frederik Pohl has complained "Robert had talked about allowing posthumous publication of his real feelings about a lot of things that he didn’t feel comfortable to talk about while he was alive, and indicated that some of his private letters would be a source for the book. Then some posthumous book with that title did come out, and it was a great disappointment. Someone — it could have been only [Virginia Heinlein] — had washed his face and combed his hair and turned whatever it was that Robert might have wanted to say into the equivalent of thank-you notes for a respectable English tea. I know that Robert wrote some much more raunchy letters than any of those, because I myself got one or two. But all the raunch has been edited out. What’s left is actually rather boring and does a great disservice to the real Heinlein, whose physical person may have been embodied as a conventional hard-right conservative but whose writing was — sometimes vulgarly — that of a free-thinking iconoclast".

Awards and honors
The book was a finalist for the 1990 Hugo Award for Best Non-Fiction Book.

Selected quotes
 "How long has this racket been going on?" — Heinlein's remark after receiving a $70 US check for his first published story..
 "I expect this to be my last venture in this field; 'tain't worth the grief" — Heinlein's response to attempts to censor his juvenile novel Red Planet for language, violence, and references to reproduction among Martians.

References

External links
 
 

1989 non-fiction books
Books by Robert A. Heinlein
Literary autobiographies
Books published posthumously
Del Rey books
Books with cover art by Michael Whelan